Yo-pop is a style of Nigerian popular music, popularized in the 1980s by Segun Adewale.  The style did not remain popular for long as it was quickly replaced by afro towards the end of the 1980s.

It was a style influenced by juju music. 

Nigerian styles of music
African popular music